The Miss Mundo Dominicana 2004 pageant was held on October 10, 2004. That year only 20 candidates competed for the national crown. The chosen winner, Claudia Cruz, represented the Dominican Republic at the Miss World 2004. The delegates used their intro dress to introduce themselves. After that they each showed their Provincial Costumes, did the swimsuit section and Evening Gown. The judges averaged out the points and then selected a delegate who did the best from their region. They would be given a sash from the region they were representing. Then they got questioned in the Top 6. They selected 3 candidate who answered great. The candidate would get a vote from the audience and the judges together and would get the winner from the highest vote. The winner would go to Miss World and become First Runner Up. In this edition, there is 3 candidate for each Dominican Regions.

Results

Special awards
 Miss Congeniality (voted by contestants) - Yohanna Torres (Valverde)
 Best Provincial Costume - Julissa Alcantara (Azua)
 Miss Elegancia - Genevet Gutiérrez (Samaná)

Final Competition Scores

Miss Dominican Regions
 Miss Communidad Dominicana en el Exterior : Mónica Angulo (Com. Dom. California)
 Miss Region del Centro Cibao : Claudia Cruz (Monseñor Nouel)
 Miss Region del Cibao Occidental : Wilma Abreu (Puerto Plata)
 Miss Region del Cibao Oriental : Genevet Gutiérrez (Samaná)
 Miss Region del Sur Occidente : Desireé Álvarez (Barahona)
 Miss Region del Sur Oriente : Natascha Forestieri (Santo Domingo)

Delegates

Trivia
 Desireé Álvarez, Miss Barahona would enter in Miss Dominican Republic 2007 and was a semifinalist.
 Genevet Gutiérrez, Miss Samaná would enter Miss Dominican Republic 2005 and become a 2nd Runner Up.
 Wilma Abreu, Miss Puerto Plata would enter Reina Nacional de Belleza Miss República Dominicana 2006 and become the winner.
 Hareld Mossle, Miss Monte Cristi would entered in Reina Nacional de Belleza Miss República Dominicana 2006.
 Claudia Cruz, Miss Monseñor Nouel, the winner was 4th Runner Up at Miss Dominican Republic 2004.
 Massiel Javier, Miss María Trinidad Sánche would enter Miss Dominican Republic 2005
 Miss Dominican Republic Organization would send Mónica Angulo to debut the country at Reina Sudamericana 2006.
 Patrizia Gagg, Miss La Altagracia would entered in Reina Nacional de Belleza Miss República Dominicana 2005.

References

External links
 ALGUNAS CANDIDATAS AL MISS MUNDO REPUBLICA DOMINICANA - Univision Foro / Forum
 las participantes a miss mundo dominicana 2006!! - Univision Foro / Forum

Miss Dominican Republic
2004 beauty pageants
2004 in the Dominican Republic